LaRoche J. Jackson (born June 21, 1984) is an American football defensive back who is currently a free agent. He played as a defensive back for Clark Atlanta University. He was signed as a free agent by the Jacksonville Sharks in 2010, played for the championship Sharks team in 2011, and played for the Sharks throughout 2012. He signed with the Lakeland Raiders in 2013. On March 30, 2013, it was announced that he had signed with the Cleveland Gladiators. On April 22, 2015, Jackson returned to the Sharks. On April 27, 2017, Jackson was released by the Sharks. On May 16, 2017, Jackson was assigned to the Tampa Bay Storm. He signed with the Atlanta Havoc in December 2017.  On March 5, 2019, Jackson returned to the AFL as he was assigned to the expansion Atlantic City Blackjacks.

References

External links
 Jacksonville Sharks bio
 Interview With Sharks Player LaRoche Jackson

1984 births
Living people
American football defensive backs
Atlantic City Blackjacks players
Clark Atlanta Panthers football players
Bloomington Extreme players
Hamilton Tiger-Cats players
Jacksonville Sharks players
Lakeland Raiders players
Cleveland Gladiators players
Las Vegas Outlaws (arena football) players
Tampa Bay Storm players
American Arena League players
People from Wilkinson County, Georgia
Players of American football from Georgia (U.S. state)